The cloud rats or cloudrunners are a tribe (Phloeomyini) of arboreal and nocturnal herbivorous rodents endemic to the cloud forests of the Philippines. They belong to the family Muridae and include five genera: Batomys  (hairy-tailed rats), Carpomys (dwarf cloud rats), Crateromys (bushy-tailed cloud rats), Musseromys (Luzon tree mice), and Phloeomys (giant cloud rats). Cloud rats are threatened by habitat loss and illegal hunting. Several species are endangered or critically endangered.

Description
Cloud rats are characterized by long furry or hairy tails and short hind limbs with grasping feet. They spend most of their time in the canopy of cloud forests, hence the name "cloud rat" or "cloudrunner". They are believed to be entirely herbivorous, primarily eating leaves, buds, bark, fruits, and seeds. Their ecology and behavior are poorly known. The smallest are members of the recently-described genus Musseromys, with a recorded weight of only  and body lengths of only .

Conservation
Several species of cloud rats are classified as endangered or critically endangered by the IUCN. Cloud rats are primarily threatened with habitat loss and human encroachment due to the extensive deforestation of the Philippines. Larger species of cloud rats (Phloeomys  and Crateromys spp.) are also hunted for food, usually by hunter-gatherer tribes in the mountains of the Philippines. In some areas, they are the most commonly hunted species, and hundreds of animals are estimated to be killed annually. Hunting or possession of wildlife is illegal in the Philippines, under Republic Act 9147 (the Wildlife Protection and Conservation Law of 2001), but enforcement still remains problematic.

Several zoos keep and breed cloud rats in captivity; including the London Zoo, Prague Zoo, Central Park Zoo, Bronx Zoo, Wingham Wildlife Park, Chester Zoo, and the Jerusalem Biblical Zoo.

Taxonomy
The cloud rat clade (the "Phloeomys division", sensu Musser & Carleton, 2005), now treated as the tribe Phloeomyini (LeCompte et al., 2008), includes the closely-related genera Batomys  (hairy-taled rats), Carpomys (dwarf cloud rats), Crateromys (bushy-tailed cloud rats), Musseromys (Luzon tree mice), and Phloeomys (giant cloud rats). They belong to the subfamily Murinae of the family Muridae (rats and mice).

Note: Extinct species known only from fossils are marked with 
 Tribe Phloeomyini
Batomys   - Hairy-tailed rats
Batomys dentatus  - Large-toothed hairy-tailed rat
Batomys granti  - Luzon hairy-tailed rat
Batomys hamiguitan  - Hamiguitan hairy-tailed rat
Batomys russatus  - Dinagat hairy-tailed rat
Batomys salomonseni  - Mindanao hairy-tailed rat
Batomys uragon 
Batomys cagayanensis 
Carpomys  - Dwarf cloud rats
Carpomys melanurus  - Dwarf cloud rat, short-footed Luzon tree rat
Carpomys phaeurus  - White-bellied Luzon tree rat
Carpomys dakal 
Crateromys  - Bushy-tailed cloud rats
Crateromys australis  - Dinagat Island cloud rat, rediscovered in 2012
Crateromys schadenbergi  - Giant bushy-tailed cloud rat
Crateromys paulus  - Ilin Island cloud rat, collected in 1981 through a dead specimen
Crateromys heaneyi  - Panay bushy-tailed cloud rat
Crateromys ballik 
Musseromys  - Luzon tree mice
Musseromys anacuao 
Musseromys beneficus 
Musseromys gulantang  - Banahaw tree mouse
Musseromys inopinatus 
Phloeomys  - Giant cloud rats
Phloeomys pallidus  - Northern Luzon slender-tailed cloud rat
Phloeomys cumingi  - Southern Luzon slender-tailed cloud rat

See also
Apomys (earthworm mice)
List of threatened species of the Philippines

References

Rats of Asia
Endemic fauna of the Philippines
Rodents of the Philippines
Mammal tribes
Taxa named by Edward Richard Alston